The Blue Duck River is a river of New Zealand. A tributary of the Dart River / Te Awa Whakatipu, it rises to the south of the Blue Duck Glacier, flowing into that river east of Cattle Flat.

See also
List of rivers of New Zealand

References

Rivers of Otago
Rivers of New Zealand